The 2023 season is Grêmio Foot-Ball Porto Alegrense's 120th season in existence and the club's. In addition to the Campeonato Brasileiro Série A, Grêmio participates in this season's editions of the Copa do Brasil, the Campeonato Gaúcho, and the Recopa Gaúcha.

Squad information

First team squad

Competitions

Overview

Recopa Gaúcha

Campeonato Gaúcho

Results summary

First stage

Table

Results by matchday

Matches
The first stage fixtures were announced on 10 November 2022.

Note: Match numbers indicated on the left hand side are references to the matchday scheduled by the Campeonato Gaúcho and not the order matches were played after postponements and rescheduled matches.

Knockout stage

Semi-finals

Campeonato Brasileiro Série A

League table

Results summary

Results by matchday

Matches
The league fixtures were announced on 14 February 2023.

Copa do Brasil

First round
The draw for the first round was held in 8 February 2023, 13:00 UTC−03:00, at the CBF headquarters in Rio de Janeiro.

Second round

Notes

References

2023 Season
Brazilian football clubs 2023 season